The following is a list of the television networks and announcers that broadcast the National Football League Championship Game from the 1940s until the 1969 NFL season (after which the NFL merged with the American Football League). The National Football League first held a championship game in 1933, it took until 1948 before a championship game would be televised. The successor to the NFL Championship Game is the NFC Championship Game.

Television

Radio

1960s

Local radio

1960s

References

See also
List of Super Bowl broadcasters
List of NFC Championship Game broadcasters
List of AFL Championship Game broadcasters
List of AFC Championship Game broadcasters

Lists of National Football League announcers
Broadcasters
ABC Sports
NFL on NBC
CBS Sports